Aulopoma sphaeroideum is a species of small land snail with an operculum, terrestrial pulmonate gastropod mollusc in the family Cyclophoridae. It is endemic to Sri Lanka.

It is about 19mm in length.

References

External links
Snails of the world:Asia:the tropical region

Cyclophoridae
Gastropods described in 1847